Nanri is a Japanese surname. Notable people with the surname include:

, Japanese jazz trumpeter
, Japanese figure skater
, Japanese voice actress and singer

Japanese-language surnames